Lars Emil Bruun (29 March 1852 – 21 November 1923) was a Danish merchant and numismatist. He established a company in 1883 that specialized in the packing and wholesaling of butter. His collection of coins and medals is kept at the National Museum of Denmark but will be sold in auction 100 years after his death.

Early life and education
Bruun was born in Ulvemose Huse, in the parish of Havdrup, in 1852. He apprenticed as a merchant in Holbæk from 1867 and later studied at Grüner's business academy before working for several large enterprises.

Business career
In 1883, Bruun established his own company which was involved in the packing and wholesaling of butter. The company grew fast and completed acquisitions of several competing companies.

Coin and medal collection
Bruun collected coins from an early age and with his increasing wealth his collection developed into one of the largest private collections of Danish, Norwegian, Swedish and British coins and medals of its time. Un 1914 and 191, he sold the Swedish part of his collection. In 1922, shortly prior to his death, he acquired an extensive coin collection which had belonged to the counts of  Brahesminde. The British part of his collection was sold in auction in London after his death, except for the coins from Northumberland, East Anglia and Ireland which was donated the Royal Danish Coin and Medal Collection at National Museum.

According to Bruun's testament, his collection of coins, bank notes and medals from Denmark, Norway, Sweden, Schlesvig and Holstein as well as his numismatic library is to act as a back-up for the Royal Danish Coin and Medal Collection for a period of one hundred years. It was initially deposited at the Museum of National History at Frederiksborg Castle but has been transferred to Nationalbanken (the central bank of Denmark) in Copenhagen.

References

External links
 Lars Emil Bruun's testament

19th-century Danish businesspeople
20th-century Danish businesspeople
Danish numismatists
1852 births
1923 deaths
People from Solrød Municipality